Regional School Unit 4 (RSU #4) is a school district headquartered in Wales, Maine. It serves Wales, Litchfield, and Sabattus.

In March 2014 the district considered privatizing its school bus services. Voters previously rejected the proposal in 2012 in a nonbinding referendum.

Schools
Oak Hill High School (9-12) - Wales
Oak Hill Middle School (6-8) - Sabattus
Carrie Ricker School (3-5) - Litchfield
Sabattus Primary School (PK-2) - Sabattus
Libby Tozier School (PK-2) - Litchfield

References

External links
 Regional School Unit 4
 Regional School Unit 4

4
Education in Androscoggin County, Maine